The 2008 Orlando Predators season was the 18th season for the franchise. Finishing the regular season with a 9–7 record, the Predators made the playoffs for the 17th consecutive year. In this season, they made the playoffs as the 5th seed in the National Conference. The Predators were eliminated in the Wild Card round of the playoffs, losing to the Cleveland Gladiators, 66–69.

Standings

Regular season schedule

Playoff schedule

Coaching

Roster

Stats

Regular season

Week 1: at Philadelphia Soul

Week 2: at New Orleans VooDoo

Week 3: vs. Utah Blaze

Week 4: vs. Georgia Force

Week 5: at Columbus Destroyers

Week 6: vs. Chicago Rush

Week 7: at Grand Rapids Rampage

Week 8: at Georgia Force

Week 9: vs. Tampa Bay Storm

Week 10: vs. San Jose SaberCats

Week 11: at Cleveland Gladiators

Week 12: at Kansas City Brigade

Week 13: vs. Dallas Desperados

Week 14: vs. Arizona Rattlers

Week 15: at Tampa Bay Storm

Week 16: vs. New Orleans VooDoo

Playoffs

National Conference Wild Card: at (4) Cleveland Gladiators

External links

Orlando Predators
Orlando Predators seasons
2008 in sports in Florida
2000s in Orlando, Florida